Rafael Pedroso (1905 – death unknown), nicknamed "Sungo", was a Cuban catcher in the Negro leagues in the 1920s.

A native of Havana, Cuba, Pedroso made his Negro leagues debut in 1926 for the Cuban Stars (West). He played for the club again in 1927, then for the Cuban Stars (East) in 1928.

References

External links
 and Baseball-Reference Black Baseball and Mexican League stats and Seamheads

1905 births
Date of birth missing
Place of death missing
Year of death missing
Cuban Stars (East) players
Cuban Stars (West) players
Baseball catchers